I. M. Ibrahim (June 23, 1941 – July 12, 2008), otherwise known as "Coach I," was the head coach of the Clemson University men's soccer team from 1967 to 1994 and was founder of the program. "The Father of Clemson Soccer" coached Clemson to two NCAA Division I Men's Soccer Championships, in 1984 and 1987.  His overall career record was 388-100-31 and he retired in 1994 as the nation's fifth-winningest soccer coach.  He coached 16 Tigers who earned 24 All-American honors.  Fifty-one Tigers were named to the All-ACC first-team 92 times.  He coached three U. S. Olympians including Bruce Murray, recipient of soccer's prestigious Hermann Trophy.  There were also eight Clemson players who were named ACC Players-of-the-Year 12 times.  His Clemson teams made 17 NCAA appearances and 6 NCAA Final Four appearances.  During his tenure, Clemson Soccer finished in the Top 20 in the nation for 18 seasons.  He coached Clemson Soccer to 11 ACC Championships and 13 regular season titles.  Ibrahim earned his undergraduate degree from Shorter College, his master's degree from Clemson, and concluded his education with a Ph.D. in chemistry from Clemson in 1970.  He is an inductee into the Clemson University Athletic Hall of Fame, the Shorter College Athletic Hall of Fame, and the South Carolina Athletic Hall of Fame.  He was honored by South Carolina Governor Richard Riley with the Order of the Palmetto in February, 1985.  In 1974, Ibrahim founded The Tiger Sports Shop, Inc. and served as its president from 1974 to 2008.  His hobbies included golf, music, wine, and sports car collecting. He was also a member of the Ferrari club of America and an avid Ferrari collector.

Death
Ibrahim collapsed on July 12, 2008 on the 15th green at Cross Creek Plantation Country Club in Seneca, South Carolina, where he was a longtime member and regular weekend golfer. An over achiever to the end, he had just completed a birdie put. He was pronounced dead at 4:45 PM at Oconee Memorial Hospital in Seneca from a sudden cardiac arrest according to the Oconee County Coroner's office.

References

1941 births
2008 deaths
Clemson Tigers men's soccer coaches
Clemson University alumni
Shorter University alumni
People from Haifa
American soccer coaches